Although the music scene of Atlanta is rich and varied, the city's production of hip-hop music has been especially noteworthy, acclaimed, and commercially successful. In 2009, The New York Times called Atlanta "hip-hop's center of gravity", and the city is home to many famous hip-hop,  R&B and neo soul musicians.

History

In the 1980s and early 1990s Atlanta's hip hop scene was characterized by a local variant of Miami's electro-driven bass music, with stars like Kilo Ali, MC Shy-D, Raheem the Dream, and DJ Smurf (later Mr. Collipark). MC Shy-D is credited with bringing authentic Bronx-style hip-hop to Atlanta (and Miami), such as 1988's Shake it produced by DJ Toomp; Jones was signed to controversial Southern hip hop label Luke Records, run by Luther Campbell aka "Uncle Luke". Arrested Development won the Grammy in 1992 with Tennessee, while Mr. Wendal & People Everyday and Kris Kross won with their hit song "Jump". The group Tag Team released their debut platinum certified album Whoomp! (There It Is) on July 20, 1993, spawned by their hit single of the same name.

By the mid-1990s, the rise of LaFace Records artists Outkast, Goodie Mob and the production collective Organized Noize led to the development of the Dirty South style of hip-hop and of Atlanta gaining a reputation for "soul-minded hip-hop eccentrics", contrasting with other regional styles. While Atlanta-area hip hop artists were from the suburban Decatur area, their prominence was eclipsed by music associated with these artists from "The S.W.A.T.S." ("Southwest Atlanta, too strong"), i.e. Southwest Atlanta, plus territory extending into the adjacent cities of College Park and East Point. The term "SWATS" came into vogue around 1996, initially made popular by  Outkast and Goodie Mob.

From the late 1990s to early 2000s, record producer Lil Jon became a driving force behind the hip hop subgenre known as crunk, known for its upbeat and club oriented hip hop sound. Record producers L.A. Reid and Babyface founded LaFace Records in Atlanta in the late-1980s; the label eventually became the home to multi-platinum selling artists such as Toni Braxton, TLC, Ciara. It is also the home of So So Def Recordings, a label founded by Jermaine Dupri in the mid-1990s, that signed acts such as Da Brat, Jagged Edge, Xscape and Dem Franchise Boyz. The success of LaFace and SoSo Def led to Atlanta as an established scene for record labels such as LaFace parent company Arista Records to set up satellite offices.

In 2009 The New York Times noted that after 2000, Atlanta moved "from the margins to becoming hip-hop's center of gravity, part of a larger shift in hip-hop innovation to the South." Atlanta hip-hop's pop breakthrough—everyone from Jermaine Dupri to OutKast to Lil Jon—involved the blend of various distillations of hard-core sounds from the West, bass beats from Florida, and styles and images from the North. Producer Drumma Boy called Atlanta "the melting pot of the South". Producer Fatboi called the Roland TR-808 ("808") synthesizer "central" to Atlanta music's versatility, used for snap, crunk, trap, and pop rap styles. The same article named Fatboi, Shawty Redd and Zaytoven the four "hottest producers driving the city".

As of 2018, Atlanta Trap music continues to dominate the pop music charts. In 2017, Atlanta recording artist Future had back-to-back releases that debuted at number one on the Billboard charts. Lil Yachty’s 2018 release Lil Boat 2 opened at number 2.

Atlanta hip-hop has influenced other mainstream forms of media. The television show Atlanta, which chronicles the lives of two cousins as they navigate the hip-hop world, exemplifies this broader impact. It has earned two Golden Globe awards and two Emmy awards. A number of Atlanta-based artists, including Killer Mike and Jermaine Dupri, have also become involved in local and national political movements.

Top-selling artists

Local multi-platinum artists include Ludacris, Ciara, B.o.B, Outkast, T.I., and Young Jeezy. The following hip-hop, rap, R&B and soul artists have had #1 or #2 albums or singles on the U.S. Hot 100 chart:

See also
Crunk music
List of hip hop musicians from Atlanta
Snap music
Southern hip hop
Trap music
Memphis rap

References

20th-century music genres
21st-century music genres
American hip hop scenes
Music of Atlanta
Southern hip hop